Ronda do Quarteirão (often shortened as "Ronda") is a public safety program implemented in the Brazilian state of Ceara in 2007 in five pilot areas, and then expanded. On February 22, 2008, it was expanded from 76 to 91 areas, covering all districts of Fortaleza.  On June 12, 2008, the program was expanded to over 20 new areas, completely covering the areas of Fortaleza, Caucaia and Maracanaú. In June 2009, the state government initiated the project in the cities of Sobral and Juazeiro do Norte.

Methodology of work 
The system provides each team with 12 officers, divided into three shifts of eight hours. The team is composed by three policemen in each eight-hour shift, two of them traveling in a Hilux SW4 SUV and a motorcycle rider giving support. The SUV and the motorcycle move together during the day. Overnight, the component of the motorcycle adds to the team that travels in the Hilux. The car's patrolling area is limited to a perimeter of 1.5 km to 3 km square. This small perimeter coverage for each team is to allow a response time of no more than 5 minutes. As the vehicles are equipped with GPS, they are restricted to that area delimited by the operational command, an "electronic fence" to register the car out of its perimeter. All vehicles are monitored as they move.

References

Public safety
Law enforcement in Brazil
Ceará